Ulmet may refer to several villages in Romania:

 Ulmet, a village in Bozioru Commune, Buzău County
 Ulmet, a village in Stoina Commune, Gorj County
 Ulmet, a village in Dobrun Commune, Olt County

and to:
Ulmet, Germany in Kusel district, Rhineland-Palatinate
The Abbaye d'Ulmet, in the Camargue